Harry Ian Moore (28 February 1941 – 16 February 2010) was an English cricketer.  Moore was a right-handed batsman who bowled right-arm medium pace. He was born at Sleaford, Lincolnshire.

He played as a top and middle-order batsman for Nottinghamshire in first-class cricket from 1962 to 1969, and one match for Minor Counties in 1973. He amassed 6,765 runs in his first-class career at an average of 25.05. He passed 1000 runs in a season three times and hit seven centuries and 31 fifties. His highest score was 206 not out against the Indian tourists in 1967, made in 355 minutes.

He was not as successful in limited-overs cricket, although he captained the Lincolnshire side in the 1974 Gillette Cup, when they beat Glamorgan.

He began his career wearing glasses while batting, but was one of the first professional cricketers to adopt contact lenses.

References

External links
Ian Moore at ESPNcricinfo
Ian Moore at CricketArchive

1941 births
2010 deaths
People from Sleaford, Lincolnshire
English cricketers
Lincolnshire cricketers
Nottinghamshire cricketers
Minor Counties cricketers